Bruce Ryburn Payne (1874-1937) was an American educator. He was the founding president of Peabody College (now part of Vanderbilt University) from 1911 to 1937.

Early life
Bruce Ryburn Payne was born on February 18, 1874, in Catawba County, North Carolina. His father, Jordan Nathaniel Payne, was a Methodist minister and teacher. His mother was Barbara Anne Eliza Warlick.

Payne was educated at the Patton School in Morganton, North Carolina, graduating in 1892. He graduated from Duke University in 1896. He received a master's degree from Duke University in 1902 and a PhD from Columbia University in 1904.

Career
Payne taught at the Morganton Academy from 1896 to 1899, when he became superintendent for the county. He taught Latin and Greek at Durham High School in Durham, North Carolina, from 1899 to 1902.

Payne taught philosophy at the College of William & Mary from 1904 to 1905. He taught at the University of Virginia from 1905 to 1911. While he was at UVA, he created the summer school.

Payne served as the founding President of Peabody College in Nashville Tennessee from 1911 to 1937. He raised funds for the construction of the buildings and hired the initial faculty.  He used the telephone to communicate with faculty and staff.

Personal life
Payne married Lula Carr on December 7, 1897. They had a son, Maxwell Carr Payne.

Death and legacy
Payne died of a heart attack on April 21, 1937, in Nashville, Tennessee. His funeral was conducted by Methodist Bishop Costen Jordan Harrell, and he was buried at the Mount Olivet Cemetery on April 23, 1937. In 1957, Peabody College dedicated a building on the north end of its campus to Dr. Payne, now called Payne Hall. Decades later, in 1979, Peabody College was acquired by Vanderbilt University.

Bibliography
The Ethical Standard and Its Educational Implications (1903).
Public Elementary School Curricula: A Comparative Study of Representative Cities of the United States, England, Germany and France. (New York: Silver, Burdett, 1905).
Common Words Commonly Misspelt (Richmond, Atlanta: B.F. Johnson Pub. Co., 1910).
Southern Prose and Poetry for Schools (with Edwin Mims; New York: Charles Scribner's Sons, 1910).
Five Years of High School Progress in Virginia (Charlottesville, Virginia, 1911).
The Payne-Garrison Speller (with Sidney Clarence Garrison; New York, Chicago: Rand, McNally & Co., 1931).

References

1874 births
1937 deaths
People from Catawba County, North Carolina
Duke University alumni
College of William & Mary faculty
University of Virginia faculty
Vanderbilt University faculty
Heads of universities and colleges in the United States
Burials at Mount Olivet Cemetery (Nashville)
People from Morganton, North Carolina